is a 2015 Japanese comedy-drama science fiction mystery television special directed by Sion Sono. It continues the story from the 2013 TV series adaptation of the seinen manga series Minna! Esper Dayo! written and illustrated by Kiminori Wakasugi. Sion Sono later directed a theatrical adaptation of the source material, released as The Virgin Psychics (2015).

Plot
After being sent back to Tokyo by her father, Sae Asami sends a text message to Kamogawa Yoshirō asking for help. Together with Yabe, Enomoto, and Mr. Teru, Yoshirō goes to Tokyo, where he infiltrates her high school. Shizuka Tachibana, a student at the school, tells him about a conflict between three different groups at the school, explaining that the male students formerly at the school have left in fear. Yoshirō is convinced that Sae Asami is caught up in the conflict and seeks to help her. On the second day, Yoshirō already finds that Yabe, Enomoto, and Mr. Teru have each been seduced by one of the three different groups.

Sae Asami is found but she insists that she has not been kidnapped and that she is doing fine. Yoshirō calls her father, Dr. Asami, and tells him that Sae's homeroom teacher Mr. Kajimoto says that Sae was merely missing school due to a cold. Dr. Asami tells Yoshirō that Sae's homeroom teacher is supposed to be Mr. Fukikoshi and explains that Mr. Kajimoto is an academic rival who is jealous of Dr. Asami's newfound fame following the discovery of the psychics.

Sae Asami and Shizuka Tachibana get into a fight over Yoshirō in a classroom and are caught by the three groups, who tie them up and rub them with toy cars and mochi that they use to induce arousal. Yoshirō, Yabe, Enomoto, and Mr. Teru confront the girls. The girls offer to take their virginity and the Yabe, Enomoto, and Mr. Teru are tempted by the offer but Yoshirō reminds them that this will cause them to lose their psychic powers and convinces them to help him protect the world instead. The girls attempt to take their virginity by force but the boys use their powers to distract and frighten the girls.

They find Sae Asami in the gymnasium and untie her. Mr. Kajimoto and Shizuka Tachibana enter and Shizuka explains that she helped to set up the encounter in order to aid her father, Mr. Kajimoto, whose career as a researcher was damaged due to Dr. Asami's discovery of psychics. Dr. Asami and Akiyama Takako arrive and Akiyama Takako uses a newfound power to force the end credits to roll early, eliminating Mr. Kajimoto's opportunity to explain his plan for revenge. Enomoto appears on stage in a leather fetish outfit in his attempt to confront Mr. Kajimoto but finds that Mr. Kajimoto and Shizuka Tachibana have already left. The girls from the school appear again to tempt Enomoto but Akiyama Takako uses her power once more to finally run the end credits.

Cast 

Shōta Sometani as Yoshirō Kamogawa
Erina Mano as Sae Asami
Rie Kitahara as Shizuka Tachibana
Makita Sports as Nagano Terumitsu a.k.a. Mr. Teru
Motoki Fukami as Yōsuke Enomoto
Reiya Masaki as Yabe Naoya
Ken Yasuda as Prof. Asami
Megumi Kagurazaka as Akiyama Takako
Manami Hashimoto as Haruka
Jin Katagiri as Teacher Yukio Kajimoto
Yuki Sakurai as Saeko
Aki Hiraoka as Karina
Maki Sawa as Rika
Dai Hasegawa
Yukimasa Tanimoto
Miko Haruno

Production
Kaho, who played Miyuki in the television series, does not appear in this special. It is explained that she has a boyfriend and has lost her virginity, thereby losing her psychic powers.

Release
The special was broadcast in Japan on April 3, 2015.

Home video
The special was released on DVD by TV Tokyo on August 19, 2015.

References

External links

2015 television films
2015 television specials
2010s Japanese-language films
2010s Japanese films
Japanese mystery comedy-drama films
Japanese high school films
Japanese science fiction comedy-drama films
2010s mystery comedy-drama films
2010s science fiction comedy-drama films
Films directed by Sion Sono
Live-action films based on manga
Films about psychic powers
Japanese television specials
Japanese television dramas based on manga
TV Tokyo original programming